Never Look Back may refer to:

Music
 Never Look Back (Blues Saraceno album), 1989
Never Look Back, an album by Darby Mills
Never Look Back, an album by Ebony Alleyne
Never Look Back, an album by Joujouka
Never Look Back, an album by Electric Touch
Never Look Back (Goldfinger album), 2020
 "Never Look Back" (Doris Day song), a song from the 1955 film Love Me or Leave Me
 "Never Look Back" (DuMonde song), 2001
 "Never Look Back", a song by Imelda May from the album 11 Past the Hour

Other uses
 Never Look Back (film)
 Never Look Back, a novel by Mignon G. Eberhart
 Never Look Back, a novel by Lesley Pearse